Stewart O. Jones (born March 20, 1983) is an American politician. He is a member of the South Carolina House of Representatives from the 14th District, serving since 2019. He is a member of the Republican party.

Jones is a member of the South Carolina Freedom Caucus.   He is 2nd Vice Chair of the House Interstate Cooperation Committee, and also serves on the House Education and Public Works Committee.

In 2023, Jones was one of 21 Republican co-sponsors of the South Carolina Prenatal Equal Protection Act of 2023, which would make women who had abortions eligible for the death penalty.

References

Living people
1983 births
Republican Party members of the South Carolina House of Representatives
21st-century American politicians